Paddy Gray (12 June 1892 – 19 July 1977) was an Australian cricketer and rugby league player. He played seven first-class cricket matches for New South Wales between 1922/23 and 1924/25. As a rugby league footballer he played first-grade for Glebe in the NSWRFL.

See also
 List of New South Wales representative cricketers

References

External links
 

1892 births
1977 deaths
Australian cricketers
New South Wales cricketers
Cricketers from Sydney
Rugby league players from Sydney
Glebe rugby league players